The Denmark Series is the fifth tier in the Danish football league system. Teams are divided into four groups of ten. The top team in each group is promoted to the Danish 3rd Division. The bottom three teams in each group are relegated to the regional Copenhagen Series, Zealand Series, Lolland-Falster Series, Funen Series, or Jutland Series as is appropriate for each club geographically.

Clubs in the Denmark Series are participants in the Danish Cup tournament. The reserve teams of top-flight Danish Superliga and second-tier Danish 1st Division clubs are allowed to play in the Denmark Series, but 1st Division reserve teams cannot win promotion, as they must stay at least two leagues below their first team squads.

References

Informational notes

Citations

External links 
 at Danish Football Association

 
5
Fifth level football leagues in Europe
1965 establishments in Denmark
Recurring sporting events established in 1965